Donald William Sweeting (born 1955) is an American university president, professor, educator, and pastor. He is currently the president of Colorado Christian University, having previously served as president of Reformed Theological Seminary, in Orlando, Florida.

Education
Donald Sweeting attended Moody Bible Institute from 1973 until 1976 and received a degree in Bible-Theology. He later went on to attend Lawrence University from 1976 until 1979 where he earned a Bachelor's of Arts in History and served as president of the university's student council (LUCC). Sweeting earned his Bachelors and Masters from  Oxford University, from 1981 until 1984 where he led the Theological Students Fellowship. He also spent a year at Regent College in Vancouver. B.C. studying under theologian J.I. Packer. From 1992 until 1998 he earned his doctorate in Church History and Historical Theology from Trinity Evangelical Divinity School . Under the supervision of John Woodbridge and Harold O.J. Brown, Sweeting's dissertation focused on the changing relationship between Catholics and Evangelicals in the United States between 1960 and 2000.

Experience

Sweeting served as an intern for U.S. Congressman John B. Anderson in 1976. After college (1979), Sweeting served with Chuck Colson and Prison Fellowship in Washington, D.C. where he coordinated early efforts in prison reform, worked on public policy, and served as a traveling assistant to Colson.

Sweeting was originally ordained at Christ Church of Lake Forest, Illinois. In 1986, he helped plant a non-denominational church in the Chain of Lakes area and served as its first full-time pastor, and senior pastor until 1997. In 1998 Sweeting was ordained in the Evangelical Presbyterian Church. He then served as senior pastor of Cherry Creek Presbyterian Church in southeast metro Denver and in addition, taught church history at Denver Seminary. During this time Sweeting also served on the board of John Stott (the Langham Foundation, later John Stott Ministries, and now called the Langham Partnership) and the National Association of Evangelicals. 

Donald Sweeting has co-authored two books, How to Finish the Christian Life and Lessons from the Life of Moody, both co-written with his father, George Sweeting. He has also published numerous articles for well-known magazines and scholarly journals.

Sweeting was the president of Reformed Theological Seminary in Orlando, Florida, and also served as the James Woodrow Hassell Professor of Church History there from 2010 until 2016.  In August of 2016 he was appointed as president of Colorado Christian University. In 2016, Sweeting was also named Alumnus of the Year at Moody Bible Institute.

Personal life 
Donald Sweeting is the grandson of Scottish and German immigrants. He is the third son of George Sweeting (1924- ), who served as the Senior Pastor of the Moody Church (1966-1972), and later as the President (1972-1986) and Chancellor (1986-2000) of the Moody Bible Institute in Chicago, Illinois. Donald Sweeting and his wife, Christina, have four adult kids together, three sons and one daughter.

References

External links
 
 Colorado Christian University  profile

Living people
1955 births
Heads of universities and colleges in the United States
Seminary presidents
Colorado Christian University
Moody Bible Institute alumni
Lawrence University alumni
Alumni of the University of Oxford
Trinity Evangelical Divinity School alumni
American Presbyterian ministers